Timofey Artyomovich Shipunov (born 20 July 2003) is a Russian football player. He plays for PFC Sochi.

Club career
On 26 June 2022, Shipunov returned to PFC Sochi. He made his Russian Premier League debut for Sochi on 26 August 2022 against FC Khimki.

Career statistics

References

External links
 
 
 
 

2003 births
Sportspeople from Krasnodar
Living people
Russian footballers
Association football midfielders
PFC Sochi players
Russian Second League players
Russian Premier League players